Kansai Music Conference (KMC) ( Kansai Myuujikku Kanfarensu), is an international music industry conference based in the city of Osaka, located next to Kobe and Kyoto in the Kansai region of Japan, approx. 600 km west of Tokyo. Established in November, 2008 by music industry executive Duane Levi, the conference is an annual event focused on the continual theme of “Building Bridges With Music” to create a global community of artists, industry and music fans for the purpose of promoting cultural exchange through music, artistic collaboration, and cultural awareness.

History
Since the first conference in 2009, KMC has established itself as a global annual event that musicians look forward to joining, a year or more in advance. 
It was initially created as a music industry conference that was to be similar in design to conferences in other countries like SXSW, WOMEX, MIDEM, and Moshito Music Conference among others.
However, due to the uniqueness of the Japanese music market, the original model was not feasible.

2009
The first Kansai Music Conference, KMC 2009 was held on September 19 and 20, 2009 at Convention Room AP Osaka. Among the workshops and discussions, was a memorial celebration for Michael Jackson.
There were a total of 16 live music venues used with approx. 52 performing artists and 20 presenters participating.

2010
After recognizing the significant differences between the Japanese music scene and those of western countries, Levi decided to adjust the structure of the conference to focus less on the business of music, and more on building community among artists, music fans and organizations in Japan through international exchange and networking. His idea was to accomplish this through cooperation and coordination with businesses in the Kansai area like hotels, restaurants, cafes and others that could benefit from musicians and tourists coming from to the Kansai area. He also established relationships with tourism bureaus like Osaka Convention & Tourism Bureau, and the Tourism Bureau offices of Malaysia and India. In an August, 2010 interview with Musicman, Levi talks about the changes that were made and his vision for the future of the conference.
As a result, KMC 2010 was expanded from 2 days to 4 days, (September 17–20) which created a 240% increase in participation over 2009, and it featured 63 performing acts from 5 continents along with 19 presenters. 
The Opening Party was held on the 17th at the music club, Flamingo The Arusha, performances were on the 18th, and the main conference was on the 19th and 20th. The main conference venue was changed to the Osaka Museum of History which also served as co-sponsor of the conference. In response to the 2010 Haiti earthquake, participating musicians did a tribute performance and benefit drive for Haiti refugees.

2011
KMC 2011 was held from September 16–19, with the same basic schedule as the previous year. However in an effort to further boost attendance and exposure for participating artists, there was the addition of an English rakugo (traditional Japanese comedy in English) show along with two high school concert bands that played in the atrium between the Osaka Museum of History and the NHK Building. There was also a grand finale that featured several performers doing a tribute to the victims of the 2011 Tōhoku earthquake and tsunami.
These performers also contributed their music to a KMC tribute video. that was released after the conference.

2012
KMC 2012 (program) was held from September 14 – 17. Following the 4 day schedule as in previous years, most of the events took place in downtown Osaka. Among some of the events and performers was a shamisen workshop (traditional Japanese instrument) and an awards ceremony.

2013
KMC 2013 was held from September 20 – 23. This year also featured the English rakugo performance, and cited additional support from the Hard Rock Cafe and the Japan Foundation.

2014 
The annual music conference was not held in 2014 in order to make structural changes and work on building sponsorships. However, KMC Africa Day was held on May 17 in the Osaka Museum of History and featured a performance by King Mensah from Togo as well as an African Bazaar.

2015 
KMC 2015 was held from September 18–22. The 2015 conference included sponsored events by D'Addario, as well as workshops including the popular English rakugo show and gospel workshops. Also special for 2015 was a feature of music from Latvia.

2016 
KMC 2016 was held from September 16–18. However, due to budget restraints, it was the held simply as a 3-day music festival featuring live performances with no conference sessions. The program was done with the cooperation of the now defunct Life in Kansai magazine as part of their September issue.
Six live performance venues were used including Bistro New Orleans, a small cafe located in the Kitahorie area of Osaka as well as Royal Horse a well-known jazz club in the Osaka's Umeda area. Featured artists included Gina Williams from Canada, Stellar Addiction from Australia and Tokyolite from Indonesia.

2017 
KMC 2017 was held from September 15–17 in the main areas of Hommachi and Kitahorie in Osaka and Sannomiya in Kobe, with 18 performing artists participating. In order to be more manageable, the overall size of the event had been reduced and only 5 venues were being used for live performances and the main conference venue was moved to the Business Innovation Center Osaka.
This was the first year to have an official networking session at the conference venue since 2009, with a total of 38 people from 4 continents in attendance. Another first was the introduction of an online aspect, "KMC Interactive" which incorporated the concept of doing two presentations using digital streaming.

2018 
KMC 2018 was held from September 14–16, again in the main areas of Hommachi and Kitahorie in Osaka. A total of 21 performing acts joined and the conference section was again held at Business Innovation Center Osaka with an interactive session and networking session as well as a panel discussion featuring singer/songwriter, Jett Edwards as a panelist on the topic of playing live performances in Japan.

2019 
KMC 2019 was held from September 14–16, with all venues in the Kitahorie area, with exception of Hard Rock Café Osaka in Hommachi. A total of 22 performing acts participated and a visual art aspect was added with 3 visual artists displaying their works in 3 locations in Kitahorie. The conference was moved to a venue in Kitahorie, Covent Garden, that provided more of a relaxed atmosphere for both the networking session and panel discussion.

2020 
Due to the COVID-19 pandemic KMC 2020 was held September 18 – 20 as a completely online event using social network streaming platforms to show performances and to do presentations and webinars, which were all shown through the top page on the conference website. In the months prior to the main conference, a regular series “Friday Live Spotlight” was created to feature overseas performers doing live performances from their homes, studios or other places that they were able to stream from. There were a total of 30 performing acts and 7 presenters from 5 continents and considering the global situation at that time, it was considered to have been a tremendous success.

Success Stories
KMC has had several accomplishments in its first 3 years. Osaka band Riot Dance Party was able to make their first tour overseas in Australia through connections made with an Aussie band at a KMC show.

Another connection was made when American hip hop artist, Legrand, met with a professor at Temple University Japan Campus in Tokyo to collaborate on a project with college students to create a character in Second Life.

Canadian singer-songwriter Katie Rox has commented on her success at KMC in an interview with Canadian music news site North By East West, saying,  “I have noticed CD sales, twitter and Facebook followers have increased since the trip, so I would say it was a success!” Rox explained the value of the conference in her view, saying further that the conference is especially valuable to independent musicians that lack the support of a major label. “You need to make it known who you are. That can be hard without label support.”

KMC has built up a team of sponsors, partners, and supporters, both in Japan and internationally.
Also, several charity drives for earthquake victims have been organized by the KMC Executive Board.

Further activities
 Promoting tourism and cultural awareness of the Kansai area to non-Japanese
 Organizing and sponsoring benefits and charity events for causes both in Japan and overseas
 Organizing, co-sponsoring, and facilitating networking events and showcases for musicians and music industry professionals in Japan year-round, with a focus on the Kansai region

Challenges
KMC provides a forum for independent musicians around the world to network with other musicians, music related companies and organizations, experience the live music scene in Japan, as well as participate in seminars, presentations and workshops about music and the music industry. There is little precedent for such an event in Japan.

As an independently organized event, KMC currently does not attract big companies, major label reps, and music industry executives like similar events in other countries, due to the general unfamiliarity of the concept and closed nature of the Japanese music industry. According to Levi, “It’s amazing how artists with such talent are practicing and performing with almost no attention from the music industry… It’s almost impossible for independent musicians in Japan to move up to the next level without help from a major company. KMC is my way of affecting change—a change to a better and more rewarding music scene in Japan.”

References

External links
 Kansai Music Conference website
 Article in Kansai Scene Magazine about KMC 2011
 Shalestone Music, producer of KMC
 Osaka Museum of History (English Page)
 Musicman-NET Special Report: Interview with KMC producer (2010)

Recurring events established in 2009
Music festivals in Japan
Music conferences
Annual events in Japan
Tourist attractions in Osaka